Reusel-De Mierden is a municipality in the southern Netherlands.

Population centres

Topography

Dutch Topographic map of the municipality of Reusel-De Mierden, June 2015

Genealogy
Reusel-De Mierden erroneously appears in more than a million family trees as a place of origin or residence. This is due to a software error that changed "Holland" to "Reusel-De Mierden, Noord-Brabant, Netherlands."

Notable people 
 Steven Mierdman (ca.1510 in Hooge Mierde – 1559) a Dutch printer of Reformation books
 Harry van Gestel (born 1953 in Reusel) a Dutch artist and painter
 Geert van der Weijst (born 1990 in Reusel) a former Dutch cyclist

See also
Hooge en Lage Mierde

Gallery

References

External links

Official website

 
Municipalities of North Brabant
Municipalities of the Netherlands established in 1997